Brigadier-General Francis Howard, 1st Earl of Effingham (bapt. 20 October 1683 – 12 February 1743) was an English peer and army officer.

Francis was the second son of Francis Howard, 5th Baron Howard of Effingham. On 26 July 1722, he was commissioned captain and lieutenant-colonel in the 3rd Regiment of Foot Guards. Howard succeeded as Baron Howard of Effingham in 1725, with the death of his older brother Thomas Howard.

He continued to rise in the Army, and was made lieutenant and lieutenant-colonel in the 1st Troop of Horse Grenadier Guards on 15 July 1731. He was created Earl of Effingham on 8 December of that year, and made a Deputy Earl Marshal on 13 December. The next year, on 22 July 1732, he received the colonelcy of a regiment of foot, which he held until 1737. On 21 June 1737, he became Captain and Colonel of the 2nd Troop Horse Grenadier Guards, with the rank of a colonel of horse, and was promoted brigadier-general on 2 July 1739. On 22 December 1740, he became Captain and Colonel of the 4th Troop of Horse Guards. He died in February 1743, and was succeeded by his eldest son Thomas (the son of his first wife Diana), then an officer in the Horse Grenadier Guards.

References

1683 births
1743 deaths
18th-century British Army personnel
Earls in the Peerage of Great Britain
British Army brigadiers
British Life Guards officers
Francis Howard, 1st Earl of Effingham
Lancashire Fusiliers officers
Scots Guards officers
Peers of Great Britain created by George II
Earls of Effingham
Barons Howard of Effingham